István Sréter de Szanda (10 November 1867 – 2 September 1942) was a Hungarian military officer and politician, who served as Minister of Defence in second half of 1920.

References
 Magyar Életrajzi Lexikon

1867 births
1942 deaths
People from Nógrád County
Hungarian soldiers
Austro-Hungarian military personnel of World War I
Austro-Hungarian Army officers
Defence ministers of Hungary